SQ, Sq, or sq may stand for:

Psychology
 Social intelligence quotient, a statistical abstraction of social intelligence
 Systemizing quotient, a measure of a person's neurological tendency to systemize

Science and technology
 SQ (program), a program for compressing files on MS-DOS and CP/M
 Sound quality, the characteristics of the output of a preamp, amp or sound system
 Stereo quadraphonic, a matrix quadraphonic gramophone record format developed by CBS

Other
 Shakespeare Quarterly, a quarterly academic journal on the works of William Shakespeare
 Albanian language (ISO 639-1 language code sq)
 Singapore Airlines (IATA airline designator SQ)
 Space Quest, a series of adventure games by Sierra Entertainment
 Square, a type of measure of area, such as square foot (sq ft)
 Block, Inc., financial services company (NYSE stock ticker SQ)
 Sûreté du Québec, the Quebec police force
 An organization from the Infinity Ring book series
SQ, a short story by Ursula Le Guin
 Subcutaneous injection, in medicine